Linda Vollstedt (born November 2, 1946) is the development director for the Arizona Sun Devils since 2001. Before holding her executive position, Vollstedt was the women's golf coach for the Sun Devils from 1980 to 2001. During her tenure as golf coach, she was the winning coach in six NCAA Division I Women's Golf Championships during the 1990s. Vollstetdt was named to the International Women's Sports Hall of Fame in 2003 and into the Arizona Sports Hall of Fame in 2009.

Early life and education
Vollstedt was born in Portland, Oregon on November 2, 1946. From Arizona State University, she earned a Bachelor of Science in 1969 with an accompanying Master of Science in 1971 and specialized in math.

Career
Vollstedt began her career as a golf player for the Arizona State Sun Devils from 1964 to 1968. Throughout the 1970s, she was a golf coach at the Alhambra High School in Phoenix, Arizona. In 1980, she returned to Arizona State to become the women's golf coach for the university. During her tenure, Vollstedt was the winning coach of the Pac-12 Conference golf championships five times through the 1980s and the NCAA Division I Women's Golf Championships six times during the 1990s. She remained as the Sun Devils golf coach until her retirement in 2001. After leaving her coaching position, she remained with Arizona State as a development director starting in 2001.

Awards and honors
In 2016, Vollstedt was selected as the Pac-12 Conference Golf Coach of the Century. For hall of fames, Vollstedt was inducted into the International Women's Sports Hall of Fame in 2003 and the Arizona Sports Hall of Fame in 2009. She was also named into the Pac-12 Conference Hall of Honor in 2018.

Personal life
Vollstedt broke her tibia during a golf accident in 1997 and had a follow up knee surgery in 2003.

References

1946 births
Arizona State Sun Devils women's golfers
Arizona State Sun Devils women's golf coaches
Living people
Sportspeople from Portland, Oregon
Golfers from Portland, Oregon